Emanuelle Around the World (Italian: Emanuelle – Perché violenza alle donne?, also known as Confessions of Emanuelle) is a 1977 sexploitation directed by Joe D'Amato. The film stars Laura Gemser and George Eastman, Karin Schubert and Ivan Rassimov.

Plot 
After meeting United Nations diplomat Dr. Robertson in New York City, journalist Emanuelle is invited to India to write a report on Guru Shanti, a man who claims to have achieved the ultimate orgasm. Once there she engages in a variety of sex acts, including one with the Guru, disproving his theory. She then heads to Hong Kong to investigate trafficked women and witnesses them being subjected to forced Bestiality. Upon her return to San Francisco in the United States, by way of Italy, she teams up with fellow reporter Cora Norman. The two snoop out a trail of men smuggling women to the Middle East, involving members of the United States government.

Cast 
 Laura Gemser as Emanuelle
 Ivan Rassimov as Dr. Robertson
 Karin Schubert as Cora Norman 
 Don Powell as Jeff Davis
 George Eastman as Guru Shanti
 Brigitte Petronio as Mary
 Marino Masè as Kassem
 Gianni Macchia as Emiro

Release
Emanuelle Around the World was released in 1977. Two versions of the film exist with each having different degrees of pornographic content.

Reception
From a contemporary review, Richard Combs of the Monthly Film Bulletin reviewed an 88-minute dubbed version of the film. Combs stated that "in terms of production values, this is easily [Emanuelle]'s most elaborate outing yet." Combs continued that the film's plot was "jettisoned as unnecessary baggage, and various episodes might have been concocted on an ad hoc basis in each of the glamour spots visited."

References

Footnotes

Sources

External links 

1977 films
Films directed by Joe D'Amato
Italian sexploitation films
Emanuelle
Zoophilia in culture
Films set in India
Films set in Hong Kong
Films set in San Francisco
Films set in Rome
Films scored by Nico Fidenco
1970s Italian films
1970s French films